William Perkins Black (November 11, 1842 – January 3, 1916) was a lawyer and veteran of the American Civil War. He received America's highest military decoration – the Medal of Honor – for his actions at the Battle of Pea Ridge, Arkansas, in 1862.

Biography
He was the brother of John C. Black, Commander of the Grand Army of the Republic, who was also a Medal of Honor recipient. The Black brothers are one of only five pairs of brothers to have received the Medal of Honor.

In 1867, together with Thomas Dent, Black founded the law firm of Dent & Black.  As a lawyer, Black was best known for having served as defense counsel to the people charged with inciting the Haymarket Riot of 1886.

He died at his home in Chicago on January 3, 1916, and was buried at Graceland Cemetery.

Medal of Honor citation
Rank and organization: Captain, Company K, 37th Illinois Infantry. Place and date: At Pea Ridge, Ark., 7 March 1862. Entered service at: Danville, Ill. Born: 11 November 1842, Woodford, Ky. Date of issue: 2 October 1893.

Citation:

Single-handedly confronted the enemy, firing a rifle at them and thus checking their advance within 100 yards of the lines.

See also

List of Medal of Honor recipients
List of American Civil War Medal of Honor recipients: A–F

References

1842 births
1916 deaths
United States Army Medal of Honor recipients
Burials at Graceland Cemetery (Chicago)
People from Park Ridge, Illinois
American Civil War recipients of the Medal of Honor
People of Illinois in the American Civil War